Kurupira is a figure in Guaraní mythology.  He is one of the seven monstrous children of Tau and Kerana, and as such is one of the central legendary figures in the region of Guaraní speaking cultures. He is also one of the few figures still prominent in the modern culture of the region.

Myths 
Kurupi is said to be somewhat similar in appearance to another, more popular figure from Guaraní mythology, the Pombero. Like the Pombero, Kurupi is said to be short, ugly, and hairy. He makes his home in the wild forests of the region, and was considered to be the lord of the forests and protector of wild animals. Kurupi's most distinctive feature, however, was a humongous penis that was ordinarily wound several times around his waist like a belt.  Due to this feature, he was at one time revered by the Guaraní as the spirit of fertility.

Much like the Pombero, Kurupi is often blamed for unexpected or unwanted pregnancies. His penis is said to be prehensile, and owing to its length he is supposed to be able to extend it through doors, windows, or other openings in a home and impregnate a sleeping woman without even having to enter the house.  Together with the Pombero, Kurupi was a scapegoat used by adulterous women to avoid the wrath of their husbands, and by single women to explain their pregnancies, including in cases of rape. Children fathered by the Kurupi were expected to be small, ugly and hairy much like their father, and if male to inherit something of their father's virility. In some cases, Kurupi is blamed with the disappearance of young women, supposedly stealing them away to his home in the forest for use in satiating his libidinous desires (rape).

The legend of Kurupi has faded somewhat in comparison to the Pombero, and figures more often as part of old tales. Rarely is he blamed with impregnating women anymore, although he is sometimes used to try and frighten young girls into being chaste.

See also 
 Trauco
 Pombero
 Jasy Jatere
 Indio Pícaro

References

Guaraní legendary creatures
Guaraní deities
Love and lust gods
Mythological rapists